Werur (also known as Mar)  is a village in Bikar, Tambrauw Regency of Southwest Papua, Indonesia.and had a population of 313 at the 2010 Census.

The Village is located on the northern coast of the Bird's Head Peninsula, also known as the Vogelkop Peninsula.

Tourism

Werur Beach 
Strolling to the western part of Papua, precisely in Tambrauw Regency, you can meet Werur Beach which has its own charm. Werur Beach, a beach that still very natural and very beautiful, the quiet atmosphere makes this tour very attractive. Indonesia with beach tourism is never-ending if you visit every area, each of which has beautiful beaches, ready to spoil your eyes with the scenery.
Indeed, not many people know about its existence, because in terms of location, it is quite far from the city center. Not to mention that the access to this beach is still very limited. But you can still include it as a destination that should not be missed when visiting Southwest Papua.

The type of sand on this beach is fine sand whose color is not so white. While the sea water is clear with the strength of the waves are quite hard. Although not as popular as Raja Ampat or other tourist spots in Papua, the charm of this beach is still enchanting. Especially if you come at sunset, when the sky starts to turn orange and starts to get darker. You can watch the view of the waves that are getting louder and faster sweeping the shore as the night progresses.

The advantage of beaches that have not been visited by many tourists is that their authenticity is still well preserved. Not much garbage or foreign objects around the beach area. Trees grow well around it. This is also a picture of the ecosystem balance in the coastal area which is still well maintained. In addition, there are also several historical spots from World War II that you can find here. Although access to this place is not yet adequate, you will still be satisfied by the beautiful relics and views that pleasant.

Even though there are not many tourists, you don't need to worry because there are local people who can help you if you need help. The people are known to be friendly to tourists. You can also ask for recommendations of interesting places around there to complete your vacation activities.

Make sure to bring your own equipment including sitting mats and food when you come to Werur Beach by not forgetting to always keep it clean. As a tourist, supporting environmental sustainability is must always be considered anywhere and anytime.

References

Populated places in Southwest Papua
Populated places in Tambrauw

Southwest Papua